Queen Anne's County Public Schools is a school district on the Eastern Shore of Maryland. All schools are accredited by the Middle States Association of Colleges and Schools.

High schools
 Kent Island, Stevensville
 Queen Anne's County, Centreville

Middle schools
 Centreville, Centreville
 Matapeake, Stevensville
 Stevensville, Stevensville
 Sudlersville, Sudlersville

Elementary schools
 Bayside, Stevensville
 Centreville, Centreville
 Church Hill, Church Hill
 Grasonville, Grasonville
 Kennard, Centreville
 Kent Island, Stevensville
 Matapeake, Stevensville
 Sudlersville, Sudlersville

Notes

External links
 Kent Island High School
 Queen Anne's County High School
 Centreville Middle School
 Matapeake Middle School
 Stevensville Middle School
 Sudlersville Middle School
 Bayside Elementary School
 Centreville Elementary School
 Church Hill Elementary School
 Grasonville Elementary School
 Kennard Elementary School
 Kent Island Elementary School
 Matapeake Elementary School
 Sudlersville Elementary School

School districts in Maryland
Education in Queen Anne's County, Maryland